The Global Food Marketplace (French: Salon International de l’alimentation, or SIAL) is a trade fair held every two years, which specializes in the food processing industry. This event was first held in 1964 in Paris.

History 
The SIAL was established in 1964 by several groups, including the Confédération Générale de l'Alimentation en détail (General Confederation of the Retail Food Trade),  and at the instigation of public authorities (Ministry of Agriculture (France)|Ministry of Agriculture, Paris Chamber of Commerce). 
Twenty-six countries participated in the first fair, which was held at the Center of New Industries and Technologies (French: Centre des nouvelles industries et technologies|CNIT) in La Défense, as part of International Food Week. The second SIAL was held in 1966, also at the CNIT.

The trade show was held at the Versailles Gate Exhibition Centre from 1968 to 1984 and at the North Paris-Villepinte Exposition Park since 1986.

In 2014, SIAL Paris marks a new stage by integrating the Salon International du Process et du Conditionnement Alimentaire (IPA show), which will be represented within the Equipment, Technology and Services sector.

Characteristics 

SIAL Paris has given rise to six other trade fairs, all members of the SIAL Group network, in China, in United Arab Emirates, in Canada and in Brazil. In 2014, SIAL Group launches a new trade show in the Philippines called SIAL ASEAN.

Within the scope of SIAL Innovation, the agencies XTC and TNS Sofres present a comparative analysis of food-related trends and innovations. 
The study conducted by TNS Sofres puts the attitudes of consumers in seven countries (France, Germany, Great Britain, Spain, Russia, United States and China) in perspective, with regard to the trends identified by XTC.

Visitors 

The fair's visitors come from various sectors of the food processing industry, such as distribution, trade, food services, viticulture, etc. Approximately 70% of the visitors visit the fair in search of new products and suppliers.

The top 15 visiting countries are:
 France
 Italy
 Belgium
 Netherlands
 United Kingdom
 Spain
 Germany
 United States
 Canada
 Russia
 Brazil
 China
 Turkey
 Poland
 Greece

Exhibitors 

The majority of the participants are suppliers of finished food products. They exhibit individually (direct exhibitor) or collectively (for example, in a national pavilion). This second option represents 61% of the fair's surface area.

79% of the exhibitors are from national (with less than 250 employees) and international small and medium enterprises and 21% are from large groups.

The exhibition sectors : 
 Beverages
 Cured meats
 Tinned and preserved products
 Grocery products
 Fruit and vegetables
 Organic products
 Seafood
 Health products and food supplements
 Gourmet foods
 Frozen foods
 Bakery, pastry and confectionery 
 Delicatessen products
 Dairy products
 Poultry and game
 Meat
 Wine
 National pavilions and regions of the world
 Regions of France
 IN-FOOD/Semi-processed food products, ingredients and outsourcing
 Equipment and technologies

Sustainable development and solidarity 

Each time the fair takes place, almost 50 tons of products are collected and redistributed to French Red Cross centers in Seine-Saint-Denis. In addition, the fair processes organic waste. In 2012, a partnership is set to be formed with Utopies, with the aim of emphasizing sustainable development.

Editions of SIAL abroad 

 The first edition of SIAL Brazil took place June 25 to 28, 2012 in São Paulo. 
 SIAL Middle East is an annual fair, established in 2010, which takes place in Abu Dhabi. 
 Established in 2001, SIAL Canada is an annual fair, which takes place in Montreal in even-numbered years and in Toronto in odd-numbered years. Next Dates: May 2 to 4, 2017
 Established in 1999 in Singapore, the annual SIAL China fair has taken place in Shanghai since the year 2000. 
 The first edition of SIAL ASEAN took place June 11 to 13, 2014 in the Philippines.

Organization chart of SIAL 

In addition to its managing director, SIAL has a supervisory board and a board of directors. Comexposium, a subsidiary of the CCIP and of the UK private equity firm Charterhouse, and SOPEXA are the principal shareholders of SIAL.

Festivals in Paris
Food and drink festivals in France
1946 establishments in France